German submarine U-185 was a Type IXC/40 U-boat of Nazi Germany's Kriegsmarine built for service during World War II.

Under the command of Kapitänleutnant August Maus, she had some success against Allied aircraft in World War II.

Laid down on 1 July 1941 by DeSchiMAG AG Weser of Bremen as yard number 1025, she was launched on 2 March 1942 and commissioned on 13 June. Twenty-nine of the crew were lost, as well as fourteen survivors from  who were on board.

Design
German Type IXC/40 submarines were slightly larger than the original Type IXCs. U-185 had a displacement of  when at the surface and  while submerged. She had two shafts and two  propellers.

U-185 was fitted with six  torpedo tubes (four fitted at the bow and two at the stern), 22 torpedoes, one  SK C/32 naval gun, 180 rounds, and a  SK C/30 as well as a  C/30 anti-aircraft gun. The boat had a complement of forty-eight.

Service history

First patrol
U-185 sailed from Kiel on 27 October 1942. On 7 December she sank the unescorted 5,476 GRT British cargo ship Peter Mærsk west of the Azores. She docked at Lorient in France on 1 January 1943 after 67 days at sea.

Second patrol
U-185 sailed from Lorient on 8 February 1943. On 10 March she attacked Convoy KG 123 in the Windward Passage (between Cuba and Hispaniola), sinking the 6,151 GRT American tanker Virginia Sinclair and the 7,177 GRT liberty ship James Sprunt. On 6 April U-185 attacked the four-ship convoy GTMO-83, and sank the 7,176 GRT liberty ship John Sevier. She then sailed to Bordeaux on 3 May after 85 days at sea.

Third patrol
On 14 June she was attacked in the Bay of Biscay by a British Whitley bomber of 10 OTU (Operational Training Unit) based at RAF St Eval in Cornwall.  was sunk, but U-185s flak defenses damaged the aircraft, forcing it to ditch.

On 7 July U-185, off Cape San Roque, Brazil, attacked the convoy BT-18, sinking the liberty ships James Robertson and Thomas Sinnickson, the 7,061 GRT tanker William Boyce Thompson also went to the bottom. She then badly damaged the 6,840 GRT tanker S.B. Hunt. On 12 July, around 90 miles off Recife, Brazil, the U-boat was attacked by a B-24 Liberator bomber of US Navy Squadron VB-107, but sustained only minor damage.

On 3 August  U-185 was attacked by a Ventura bomber of Squadron VB-107 with depth charges, wounding one man.

Sinking
On the morning of 11 August 1943 U-185 rendezvoused with the stricken , which had been badly damaged after two attacks by US aircraft and the destroyer , but which began to transfer provisions, fuel oil and spare parts to U-185.  arrived later to assist, but the concentration of U-boats was detected by HF/DF; as a result, the surfaced boats were attacked by a United States Navy PBY-4 Liberator, of Squadron VB-107. U-172 escaped, the crew of U-185 opened fire with AA guns, shooting down the aircraft, killing the crew of three.

After U-604 was scuttled, U-185 headed for home, with 100 men crammed aboard a U-boat designed for 54. On 16 August she transferred 23 men to U-172. The U-boat was spotted by a Grumman TBF-1 Avenger and Grumman F4F Wildcat attack team of Squadron VC-13, flying from the escort carrier . The aircraft attacked with machine guns and depth charges, killing the U-boat's lookouts and AA crew and rupturing the pressure hull, allowing seawater to reach the battery cells and produce toxic chlorine gas. One diesel engine caught fire, producing more fumes, and all electrical systems were knocked out, plunging the vessel into darkness.

Realizing that the situation was hopeless, Maus ordered all hands to abandon ship. More than 40 men managed to reach the deck and jump into the sea as U-185 sank. Only 36 men were later rescued by the destroyer , the rest succumbing to wounds or chlorine poisoning. The 25 men from U-185 and the nine survivors from U-604 spent the following three years as POWs before returning to Germany.

On 21 September 1943 Kapitänleutnant August Maus was awarded the Knight's Cross of the Iron Cross.

Wolfpacks
U-185 took part in one wolfpack, namely:
 Westwall (8 November - 16 December 1942)

Summary of raiding history

References

Bibliography

External links

German Type IX submarines
U-boats commissioned in 1942
U-boats sunk in 1943
World War II submarines of Germany
1942 ships
World War II shipwrecks in the Atlantic Ocean
Ships built in Bremen (state)
U-boats sunk by US aircraft
U-boats sunk by depth charges
Maritime incidents in August 1943